Joris Kramer (born 2 August 1996) is a Dutch professional footballer who plays as a defender for Eredivisie club NEC.

Club career
Kramer made his professional debut in the Eerste Divisie for FC Dordrecht on 5 August 2016 in a game against FC Oss.

On 1 July 2022, Kramer signed a three-year contract with NEC.

References

External links
 

1996 births
Living people
People from Heiloo
Association football defenders
Dutch footballers
AZ Alkmaar players
Jong AZ players
FC Dordrecht players
SC Cambuur players
Go Ahead Eagles players
NEC Nijmegen players
Eredivisie players
Eerste Divisie players
Footballers from North Holland
21st-century Dutch people